Dai Lewis  (born 2 February 1912, date of death unknown) was a Welsh international footballer. He was part of the Wales national football team, playing 2 matches. He played his first match on 26 October 1932 against Scotland and his last match on 16 November 1932 against England.

See also
 List of Wales international footballers (alphabetical)

References

1912 births
Year of death missing
Welsh footballers
Wales international footballers
Place of birth missing

Association footballers not categorized by position